James Douglas Grant Dunn  (21 October 1939 – 26 June 2020), also known as Jimmy Dunn, was a British New Testament scholar, who was for many years the Lightfoot Professor of Divinity in the Department of Theology at the University of Durham. His best known for his work on the New Perspective on Paul, which is also the title of a book he published in 2007.

He worked broadly within the Methodist tradition and was a member of the Church of Scotland and the Methodist Church of Great Britain during his life.

Biography

Dunn was born on 21 October 1939 in Birmingham, England. 

He had the following degrees:
BSc Economics and Statistics at University of Glasgow class II Honours, 1961.
BD at University of Glasgow, 1964, with distinction.
PhD at University of Cambridge, 1968.
DD at University of Cambridge, 1976.

Dunn was licensed as a minister of the Church of Scotland in 1964.  He was chaplain to overseas students at Edinburgh University in 1968-70.

In 1970, Dunn became a lecturer in divinity at the University of Nottingham, and was promoted to reader in 1979.  Whilst at Nottingham, he served as a Methodist local preacher.

He became professor of divinity at Durham University in 1982, and in 1990 became Lightfoot Professor of Divinity at Durham.  He retired in 2003, and was succeeded as Lightfoot Professor of Divinity by John M. G. Barclay. 

For 2002, Dunn was the President of the Studiorum Novi Testamenti Societas, an international body for New Testament study. Only three other British scholars had been made President of the body in the preceding 25 years. In 2006 he became a Fellow of the British Academy.

In 2005 a Festschrift was published dedicated to Dunn, comprising articles by 27 New Testament scholars, examining early Christian communities and their beliefs about the Holy Spirit in Christianity. In 2009 another Festschrift was dedicated to Dunn for his 70th birthday, consisting of two forewords by N. T. Wright and Richard B. Hays and 17 articles all written by his former students who went on to have successful careers in either academic and ministerial fields around the world.

Dunn was especially associated with the New Perspective on Paul, along with N. T. Wright and E. P. Sanders.

Dunn took up Sanders' project of redefining Palestinian Judaism in order to correct the Christian view of Judaism as a religion of works-righteousness. One of the most important differences to Sanders is that Dunn perceives a fundamental coherence and consistency to Paul's thought. He furthermore criticizes Sanders' understanding of the term justification, arguing that Sanders' understanding suffers from an "individualizing exegesis".

Works

Dunn wrote or edited numerous books and papers, including:

Books

Chapters

Journal articles

References

External links
Professional page, Durham University
The New Perspective on Paul
James D. G. Dunn in-depth interview on "Beyond Evangelical"

1939 births
2020 deaths
Academics of Durham University
Arminian theologians
Alumni of Clare College, Cambridge
Alumni of the University of Glasgow
British biblical scholars
British Christian theologians
British evangelicals
British Methodists
Critics of the Christ myth theory
Fellows of the British Academy
Methodist local preachers
New Testament scholars
People educated at Hutchesons' Grammar School
People from Birmingham, West Midlands
Scottish Christian theologians
Scottish biblical scholars
Scottish evangelicals
Scottish Methodists